Stopce is a small village in the Municipality of Laško in eastern Slovenia. It lies in hills southeast of Laško. The area is part of the traditional region of Styria. It is now included with the rest of the municipality in the Savinja Statistical Region.

Two small roadside chapel-shrines in the settlement both date to the 19th century.

References

External links
Stopce on Geopedia

Populated places in the Municipality of Laško